() is a Japanese company based in Sumida, Tokyo. It is part of the Mitsubishi and Oji Paper group and is listed on the Nikkei 225.

References

External links 
 

Companies listed on the Tokyo Stock Exchange
Companies listed on the Osaka Exchange
Pulp and paper companies of Japan
Mitsubishi companies
Manufacturing companies based in Tokyo
Japanese companies established in 1898